David Matthews (born March 4, 1942), is an American keyboardist, pianist, and arranger.

Early life and education 
Matthews was born David Richard Matthews in Sonora, Kentucky. He earned a bachelor's degree in composition from the University of Cincinnati.

Career 
Matthews has composed television soundtracks as well as albums with the Manhattan Jazz Orchestra. He is the leader of the Manhattan Jazz Quintet. Matthews was also the leader of the musical group the Grodeck Whipperjenny.

In 1970, he began working as both an arranger and bandleader for James Brown. Matthews has worked with many musicians, including Bonnie Raitt, Buddy Rich, Idris Muhammad, and the Starland Vocal Band. He was staff arranger for Creed Taylor's CTI Records label in the mid-1970s, working on albums for artists such as George Benson, Esther Phillips, Grover Washington Jr., Hank Crawford, and Idris Muhammad. 

In 1977, he became one of the first artists to dedicate an entire composition to Frank Herbert's Dune, publishing an album that went by the same name.

In 1978, Matthews arranged strings and orchestra and played piano on Nina Simone's album Baltimore.

Matthews has been sampled by many hip-hop musicians such as The Notorious B.I.G., Nas, MF DOOM, Method Man, Redman and Large Professor and others.

Discography

As leader 

 The Grodeck Whipperjenny, People – rec. 1970
 Big Band Recorded at the Five Spot (Muse, 1975)
 Shoogie Wanna Boogie with Whirlwind (Kudu, 1976)
 Dune (CTI, 1977)
 Digital Love (Electric Bird, 1979)
 Cosmic City with the Electric Birds (King, 1980)
 Grand Cross (Bellaphon, 1983)
 Delta Lady (Electric Bird, 1983)
 Super Funky Sax (Electric Bird, 1984)
 Billy Boy (King/Paddle Wheel, 1986)
 Waltz for Debby (Paddle Wheel, 1987)
 Speed Demon with the First Calls (Electric Bird, 1989)
 Jazz Ballads with Strings (Sweet Basil, 1991)
 Super Trombone (Sweet Basil, 1995)
 Watermelon Man (Sweet Basil, 1997)
 Furuhata Jazz in N.Y. (WEA, 1997)
 Mambo No. 5 (Sweet Basil, 1998)
 Back to Bach (Milestone, 2000)
 Girl from Ipanema with N.Y. Friends (Videoarts Music, 2002)
 Impressions with N.Y. Friends (Videoarts Music, 2002)
 Hey Duke! with the Manhattan Jazz Orchestra (Milestone, 2002) – rec. 1999

Appears on 
 James Brown, Sho' Is Funky Down Here, (King, 1971)
 James Brown, "I Cried/World Pt. 2", (Starday King, 1971)[7"]
 Vicki Anderson, "I'll Work It Out/In the Land of Milk and Honey", (Brownstone, 1971)[7"]
 James Brown, "I Got a Bag of My Own", (Polydor, 1972)[7"]
 Lyn Collins, Think (About It), (People, 1972)
 James Brown, "Sexy, Sexy, Sexy", (Polydor, 1973)[7"]

Production
With Patti Austin
End of a Rainbow (CTI, 1976) - Arranger

With George Benson
In Concert-Carnegie Hall (CTI, 1975) - Arranger
Good King Bad (CTI, 1975) - Arranger
Benson & Farrell with Joe Farrell (CTI, 1976) - Arranger

With Jim Hall
Concierto de Aranjuez (Evidence, 1981) - Composer, Arranger, Electric Piano

With Ron Carter
Anything Goes (Kudu, 1975) - Arranger

With Hank Crawford
I Hear a Symphony (Kudu, 1975) - Composer and Arranger
Hank Crawford's Back (Kudu, 1976) - Composer and Arranger

With Art Farmer
Something You Got (CTI, 1977) - Arranger & Piano
Big Blues with Jim Hall (CTI, 1978) - Arranger

With Grant Green
The Main Attraction (Kudu, 1976) - Arranger

With Urbie Green
The Fox (CTI, 1976) - Arranger
Señor Blues (CTI, 1977) - Arranger & Piano

With Yusef Lateef
Autophysiopsychic (CTI, 1977) - Arranger
With O'Donel Levy
Everything I Do Gonna Be Funky (Groove Merchant, 1974) - Arranger
With Blue Mitchell
Many Shades of Blue (Mainstream, 1974) - Composer, Arranger and Conductor

With Idris Muhammad
House Of The Rising Sun (Kudu, 1975)
Turn This Mutha Out (Kudu, 1977)
Boogie to the Top (Kudu, 1978)

With Nina Simone
Baltimore (CTI, 1978) - Arranger & Piano

With Jeremy Steig
Firefly (CTI, 1977) - Arranger & Piano

References

External links

Interviews 
 James Brown Arranger David Matthews Lecture (Rome 2004) | Red Bull Music Academy

1942 births
Living people
People from Hardin County, Kentucky
The J.B.'s members
American jazz pianists
American bandleaders
American jazz composers
American male jazz composers
Muse Records artists
James Brown
University of Cincinnati alumni
Jazz musicians from Kentucky
Manhattan Jazz Quintet members
CTI Records artists
American jazz keyboardists
American male pianists
American session musicians
Jazz fusion pianists
American music arrangers
20th-century American pianists
21st-century American keyboardists
21st-century American pianists
20th-century American male musicians
21st-century American male musicians
American male jazz musicians
20th-century American keyboardists